Hefei Meiling is a Chinese home appliance manufacturer which is based in Hefei, China. It is eight largest home appliance manufacturer in China with annual revenue around $1.71 billion in 2013. It was founded in 1992

2018: On July 3, the company's full name was changed from "Hefei Meiling Co., Ltd." to "Changhong Meiling Co., Ltd.", the company's A-share securities abbreviation was changed from "Meiling Electric" to "Changhong Meiling", and the company's B-share securities abbreviation was changed. Changed from "Wanmeiling B" to "Hongmeiling B".

On July 20, 2020, Heifei Meiling was added to the Entity List by the United States Department of Commerce.

References

Chinese brands
Manufacturing companies based in Hefei
Chinese companies established in 1992